Clarence Deshong Bell (February 4, 1914 – July 26, 2002) was an American politician who served as a Republican member of the Pennsylvania's 9th Senatorial district from 1960 until his death in 2002. He also served as a member of the Pennsylvania House of Representatives from 1954 to 1959. 

Bell is the longest-serving state senator in Pennsylvania history.

Early life and education
Bell was born in Upland, Pennsylvania on February 4, 1914, to Samuel R. and Belle (Hanna) Bell. Bell graduated from Swarthmore College in 1935. He graduated from Harvard Law School in 1938 and received a doctorate in law from Harvard Law School in 1970. Bell also studied at the US Army Command and General Staff College.

Personal life
Bell was a Major General in the Pennsylvania National Guard and served during World War II. Bell served for 38 years in the Army and reserves.

Bell is interred at the Chester Rural Cemetery in Chester, Pennsylvania.

References

External links
 official PA Senate profile (archived)

1914 births
2002 deaths
20th-century American politicians
United States Army personnel of World War II
Burials at Chester Rural Cemetery
Harvard Law School alumni
Republican Party members of the Pennsylvania House of Representatives
Republican Party Pennsylvania state senators
People from Delaware County, Pennsylvania
Swarthmore College alumni
United States Army Command and General Staff College alumni
Military personnel from Pennsylvania